Celine Dion in Concert was the fourth concert tour by Celine Dion. The tour consisted of 51 shows held between 13 July 1992 and 13 May 1993. It was organized to support her eleventh studio album Celine Dion (1992).

History
During the summer of 1992, Céline Dion did an American tour as the opening act for Michael Bolton. They kicked off the "Time, Love and Tenderness Tour" on 13 July 1992 at the Hollywood Bowl in Los Angeles, California. In the space of one month, they performed the show in twenty-thousand-seat-arenas. Dion also joined Bolton for the song "Hold On, I'm Comin'." According to Celine, the opening for Michael Bolton was exhausting, particularly because she had to change cities every day. "But we were finally doing what we had always dreamed of doing: working in the country that created the big time", Celine has said. In the beginning, Celine performed for very restless, impatient audiences who were waiting to hear Michael Bolton and were not interested in her. "I had a defective sound system and very little space because the stage was taken up by the mixers and instruments for the main act."  The concerts were held outdoors, and it was still daylight when Celine went onstage.  Eventually Rene Angelil was able to convince the producers to begin the show a half-hour later. By the end of the tour, Celine had good lighting and a better sound system.

Between August 1992 and March 1993 she toured Quebec, Canada. In August 1992, in front of more than 45,000 people, Dion took part in a historic concert at Le Parc des Iles on Ile Ste-Hélène to celebrate the 350th anniversary of Montreal. She performed duets with Aaron Neville, Peabo Bryson and The Atlanta Super Choir in a concert that was later aired on the CBC's Les Beaux Dimanches. On 23 March 1993 Dion began her English-language Canada leg of the tour, with five sold-out concerts at the Montreal Forum. This last leg included 28 dates and 75,000 tickets. When they went on sale, the tickets were sold in 5 hours.

According to Le Soleil (17 November 1993) Dion gave 17 concerts at Capitole Theatre, Quebec City since its opening in November 1992 with an average of 1,300 tickets sold per show. She was the most profitable act for the venue.

Dion typically performed 15 songs during her 90-minute shows. The set list included mainly songs from her latest English album Celine Dion, but also few from her previous albums (Unison and Dion chante Plamondon) and three covers: "Sorry Seems to Be the Hardest Word," "Can't Help Falling in Love" and "(You Make Me Feel Like) A Natural Woman."

Dion was supposed to sing in Campbellton and Caraquet in May 1993, but these concerts were cancelled because of death of her niece Karine. It was announced that they would be rescheduled later that summer. An additional 4 concerts which Dion had to postpone after Karine's death were performed in September 1993.  During the 7–8 September 1993 concerts, Celine performed songs from her upcoming album "The Colour Of My Love". Singer Anthony Kavanagh did the opening act at Celine's shows in Quebec, Canada. In the rest of the country, Lennie Gallant did some opening acts. Some of the concerts of the tour were actually special performances for some festivals like the "Grand Prix de Trois-Rivières", "Montréal au rythme des Amériques", "Canadian National Exhibition" and the "Gatineau Hot Air Balloon Festival".

Opening acts
 Anthony Kavanagh (Quebec)
 Lennie Gallant (Canada)

Set list
 "Des mots qui sonnent"
 "Where Does My Heart Beat Now"
 "Sorry Seems to Be the Hardest Word"
 "Love Can Move Mountains"
 "L'amour existe encore"
 "Je danse dans ma tête"
 "Unison"
 "If You Asked Me To"
 "Did You Give Enough Love"
 "Beauty and the Beast"
 "Water from the Moon"
 "With This Tear"
 "(You Make Me Feel Like) A Natural Woman" 
 "Nothing Broken but My Heart"
 "Le blues du businessman"
 "Can't Help Falling in Love"

Tour dates

Festivals and other miscellaneous performances
This concert was a part of the "Grand Prix de Trois-Rivières"
This concert was a part of the  "Montréal au rythme des Amériques"
This concert was a part of the "Canadian National Exhibition"
This concert was a part of the "Gatineau Hot Air Balloon Festival"

References

Celine Dion concert tours
1992 concert tours
1993 concert tours